Ton classes are categories used to identify classes of yachts.

Thames tonnage

Early attempts at creating rating rules were based on the British "old tonnage measurement" system to calculate the volume of the hold of large commercial ships. It gave the vessel's carrying capacity in tons (at 35 cubic feet per ton) or, as some believe, in tuns. Sail area was not included, of course, nor were any credits given for less efficient rigs so, naturally, in the yacht-racing field the cutters predominated. Eventually, this rule was modified in 1854 as the Thames Measurement Rule:

where the length is in feet, from the stempost to sternpost; and the beam is the maximum beam, in feet.

Godinet rule 

The Godinet rule was adopted in 1892 by the "Union des yachts français", and was quickly adopted by other nations from the European continental. It allowed the classifications of yachts by tons, with a formula established by Auguste Godinet which considers displacement, length, and the total sail area.

where:
 L = LWL
 P = girth of the hull
 S = Sail area
 T = Rule in tons
The Société Nautique de Genève, which was an early adopter of the rule, amended it in 1901 to include the skin girth instead of the chain girth.

This new French rule was adopted in December 1892 by Switzerland followed by Germany, Denmark, Finland and Sweden in March 1893. Belgium and Spain completed the list. In March 1894 the Godinet rule is first noted in the United States, at the construction of the Vendenesse, the world's first aluminium yacht.

Some yacht in existence that were designed to the Godinet rule:
 Bona Fide: designed by Charles Sibbick in 1898 to rate as a 5-tonner. It was built at the Albert Yard, Cowes, for J.Howard Taylor, who later won the gold medal in the category 3 to 10 tons at the 1900 Olympics. This yacht was authentically restored between 1999 and 2003 by the Cantiere Navale dell'Argentario, in Tuscany, and is the last 19th-century Godinet rater.
 Calypso: designed and built in 1911 to rate as a 3-tonner

Olympic Games 
The Ton classes were Olympic classes in 1900 and probably also in 1896. Due to weather conditions the yacht races in 1896 were cancelled and much information of that event is no longer available. For the 1900 events, sailing categories were established based on the Godinet rule:

 0.5 Ton
 0.5–1 Ton
 1–2 Ton
 2–3 Ton
 3–10 Ton
 10–20 Ton
 Open Class

1900 Olympics

See also
Metre Rule (sailing)
Square Metre Rule (sailing)
Universal Rule

References 
 

 
Keelboats
Olympic sailing classes